Head pressing is a veterinary condition characterized by pressing the head against a wall or pushing the face into a corner for no apparent reason. This condition is seen in dogs, cats, cows, horses, and goats. Head pressing is usually a sign of a neurological disorder, especially of the forebrain (e.g., prosencephalon disease), or of toxicity due to liver damage, such as portosystemic shunt and hepatic encephalopathy.

It should be distinguished from bunting, which is a normal behavior found in healthy animals.

Possible causes
 Prosencephalon disease
 Liver shunt
 Brain tumor
 Metabolic disorder (e.g., hyponatremia or hyperatremia)
 Stroke
 Infection of the nervous system (rabies, parasites, bacterial, viral or fungal infection)
 Head trauma

Liver neurotoxicity
A liver shunt is a congenital or acquired condition that may lead to toxicity and head pressing. Additional symptoms include drooling and slow maturation early in development. Middle-aged and older animals more commonly suffer from liver cirrhosis than younger animals.

Viral causes
Several viruses that cause encephalitis or meningoencephalitis can lead to the neurological sign of head pressing, such as eastern equine encephalitis and bovine herpesvirus 5.

See also
 Bovine malignant catarrhal fever
 Canine brain tumors

References

Animal diseases
Bovine diseases
Cat diseases
Horse diseases